Kaayam may refer to:
 Asafoetida, the Malayalam name for a species of Ferula native to Persia
 Memecylon edule, a small evergreen tree native to India